Naa Rani Nee Maharani is a 2010 Indian Kannada-language film directed by B. Ramamurthy starring Pooja Gandhi and Akshay Shashwath in the lead roles. The film has a similar storyline to Rani Maharani (1990).

Cast

 Pooja Gandhi as Rani and Pooja 
 Akshay Shashwath
 Pramila Joshai
 Sundar Raj
 Ramesh Bhat
 Anilkumar
 Dingri Nagaraj
 Mohan Juneja
 Honnavalli Krishna
 Harish Roy

Music

Reception 
 Shruti Indira Lakshminarayana from Rediff.com scored the film at 1.5 out of 5 stars and says "Vinaychandra's music is soothing. The song Kugo kolige khara masala from the original has been retained. But the original composition remains unmatched, and so does the original Rani Maharani". A critic from The New Indian Express wrote "At this juncture, the director introduces a sequence explaining how Pooja’s relatives want to exploit her for the sake of money. Pooja has tried her level best to perform well, but has failed. The movie is worth watching if you want to see how Pooja manages to play the dual character". B. S. Srivani from Deccan Herald wrote "The music director is one to watch out for. The same cannot be said of Mallikarjun’s camerawork which compliments Ramamurthy’s old habits. Only the bunch of kids and Pooja’s dhishoom-dhishoom in a lovely pink saree in the climax manage to linger. A wasted opportunity". A critic from DNA wrote "This is just one of the many uncertainities. In the acting department, Pooja seems to have the plum and does a good job. The two heroes remain mere props. Skip this one, opt for the DVD of the older version, we'd say". A critic from The Times of India scored the film at 2.5 out of 5 stars and wrote "Full marks to Pooja Gandhi for her brilliant performance. Sundarraj, Pramila Joshai and Ramesh Bhat excel. Debut music director Vinaya Chandra has given a couple of catchy tunes".

References

2010s Kannada-language films
2010 films
Films directed by B. Ramamurthy